Numinbah Nature Reserve is a protected nature reserve that is located in the Northern Rivers region of New South Wales, in eastern Australia.

The reserve is part of the Mount Warning/Tweed caldera, situated in the Border Ranges; and is part of the Shield Volcano group of the UNESCO  World Heritagelisted Gondwana Rainforests of Australia inscribed in 1986 and added to the Australian National Heritage List in 2007. It is also part of the Scenic Rim Important Bird Area, identified as such by BirdLife International because of its importance in the conservation of several species of threatened birds.

Description
Below the cliffs are extensive sub tropical rainforests. The reserve is intended to be a place where the flora and fauna are free from interference from humans, domestic animals and feral pests. The southern edges are bounded by private landholdings.

Vegetation 

The vegetation is primarily sub-tropical rainforest with some wet sclerophyll forest. A group of Antarctic beech are at their northernmost limit of natural distribution. The beech trees are in an area of one hectare, within a cool temperate rainforest stand of 2.9 hectares at Best-of-all Lookout in Numinbah Nature Reserve. Located in a high rainfall area with frequent mist. Many of the trees are in the form of a depauperate thicket, with stems arising from massive, gnarled, above-ground roots. An often photographed, triple stemmed tree is situated in the reserve, just south of the state border. This plant is considered to be of a great age.

The rare rainforest tree Springbrook leatherwood occurs in this reserve. The subtropical rainforest at the base of the rhyolite cliffs is considered outstanding amongst the rainforests of Australia. Particularly at the heads of Pat Smiths Creek, Crystal Creek and Couchy Creek. Soils are enriched with basalt on a shelf below the Springbrook plateau. Many rare species of plants and unusually tall trees are present beside huge fallen rhyolite blocks. Climbing plants have been recorded at a diameter of one metre. The rainforest botanist A.G.Floyd has recorded the following species as record sizes in this nature reserve; black booyong, purple cherry, red lilly pilly, rose marara and black bean.

See also

 Protected areas of New South Wales

References

External links

Nature reserves in New South Wales
Gondwana Rainforests of Australia
Forests of New South Wales
Important Bird Areas of New South Wales
Northern Rivers
1981 establishments in Australia
Protected areas established in 1981